Kalanchoe arborescens is a species of Kalanchoe, native to Madagascar.

arborescens
Endemic flora of Madagascar